Véronique Olmi (born 1962) is a French playwright and novelist. She won the Prix Alain-Fournier emerging artist award for her 2001 novella Bord de Mer. It has since been translated into several European languages. Olmi has published a dozen plays and half a dozen novels.

Bibliography 
Theatre
1996: Le Passage, Édition de l'Arche 
1997: Chaos debout/Les nuits sans lune, Édition de l'Arche
1998: Point à la ligne/La Jouissance du scorpion, Édition de l'Arche 
2000: Le Jardin des apparences, Actes Sud
2001: Mathilde, Actes Sud
2006: Je nous aime beaucoup, Éditions Grasset
2009: Une séparation, Triartis
2014: Des baisers, pardon Avant-Scéne

Novels
 Bord de mer, Actes Sud, 2001 et 2003, (translated as Beside the Sea by Adriana Hunter, published by Peirene Press)
Prix Alain-Fournier in 2002, Babel, J'ai lu
 Numéro six, Actes Sud, 2002 Babel, J'ai lu, Biblio Collège et Biblio lycée.  
 Un si bel avenir, Actes Sud, 2003 Babel 
 La petite fille aux allumettes, Stock, 2004 
 La pluie ne change rien au désir, Grasset, 2005 le Livre de Poche
 Sa passion, Grasset, 2007. Le Livre de Poche
 La Promenade des russes, Grasset, 2008 Le Livre de Poche
 Le Premier Amour, Grasset, 2010 Le Livre de Poche
 Cet été-là, Grasset, 2011, Le Livre de Poche 
Prix Maison de la Presse 2011
 Nous étions faits pour être heureux, Albin Michel, 2012, Le Livre de Poche
 La Nuit en vérité, Albin Michel, 2013
 J’aimais mieux quand c’était toi, Albin Michel, 2015
 Participe au recueil "Nous sommes CHARLIE" 60 écrivains unis pour la liberté d'expression. janvier 2015
Bakhita: A Novel of the Saint of Sudan, Editions Albin Michel, 20117
Les Évasions particulières, Albin Michel, 2020, (translated as Daughters Beyond Control by Alison Anderson, published by Europa Editions)
Théâtre
 Un autre que moi, Albin Michel, 2016

Short stories
 Privée, Édition de l'Arche, 1998

Biographie Théâtre en France :

 1997: Le Passage directed by Brigitte Jaques-Wajeman (
 1998: Chaos debout directed by Jacques Lassalle (Festival officiel d'Avignon. Les Abbesses théâtre de la Ville)
 1998: Point à la ligne directed by Philippe Adrien (Vieux Colombiers Comédie française) Prix CIC Théâtre
 2000: Le jardin des apparences directed by Gildas Bourdet (La Criée. Théâtre Hebertot) Nomination aux Molières meilleur auteur. Molière meilleur acteur pour Jean-Paul Roussillon.
 2002: Mathilde directed by Didier Long (Théâtre du Rond Point)
 2006: Je nous aime beaucoup directed by José Paul (Petit Théâtre de Paris)
 2009: Une séparation (Mise en espace Christophe Correia auFestival de la correspondance de Grignan) Prix Beaumarchais-Durance.
2011: "Vivre-écrire-vivre" : adaptation de la correspondance de Tsvétaïeva à Konstantin Rodzevitch. Mise en espace Richard Brunel, au Festival de la correspondance de Grignan
 2013: Une séparation directed by Jean-Philippe Puymartin and Anne Rotenberg (Théâtre des Mathurins)

Screenwriter :
 Bord de mer for Bagherra Production
 Un souvenir for Jade Production et France 2

'Actress:
 À demain Modigliani (V. Olmi) (directed by François Lazaro)
 Je nous aime beaucoup (V. Olmi) (directed by José Paul)
 Le Diable (M. Tsvétaïeva) (directed by D.M. Maréchal)
 La Reine de Nacre (Bernard Werber) (réalisation Bernard Werber)
 Un mariage d'écriture et d'amour (Carson Mc Cullers) (mise en espace Anne Rotenberg)
 Les nuits sans lune (V.Olmi) (mise en espace Doris Mirescu)
 Bord de mer (V. Olmi)
 La Jouissance du scorpion (V.Olmi)
 Une Séparation'' (V.Olmi) (directed by Jean-Philippe Puymartin et Anne Rotenberg)

Mise-en-scène:
"Rilke, Pasternak, Tsvetaïeva, la correspondance inachevée" avec Michael Lonsdale, Paris, Maison de la Poésie

References

External links 
 Chronique sur ses romans Bord de Mer et Numéro Six

People from Nice
1962 births
French women novelists
French women dramatists and playwrights
Living people
20th-century French novelists
21st-century French novelists
20th-century French women writers
21st-century French women writers
Prix Maison de la Presse winners
Prix Alain-Fournier winners